Sypnoides curvilinea is a species of moth of the family Noctuidae. It is found in China and India.

References

Moths described in 1867
Calpinae